Raja Asif Mahmood (Urdu: راجہ آصف محمود, born 18 December 1975 in Rawalpindi) is a Pakistani cricketer who played two ODIs in 1998. A batsman, he managed only 14 runs in his two appearances, and was subsequently dropped.

References 
 

1975 births
Living people
Pakistan One Day International cricketers
Cricketers at the 1998 Commonwealth Games
Pakistani cricketers
Rawalpindi cricketers
Rawalpindi B cricketers
Khan Research Laboratories cricketers
Cricketers from Rawalpindi
Commonwealth Games competitors for Pakistan